Santa María de los Caballeros is a municipality located in the province of Ávila, Castile and León, Spain. According to the 2006 census (INE), the municipality has a population of 112 inhabitants.

The parish church of Santa María de los Caballeros was built in the 16th century and its transepts were added in the 19th or 20th century.

References

Municipalities in the Province of Ávila